Josh Rice may refer to:

Josh Rice, band member in The Magic Mushrooms
J Rice (Josh Rice, born 1988), American pop singer
Josh Rice (rugby league), former Hawaii Warriors football player and United States rugby league player